Usora may refer to the:

 Usora (river), in central-northern Bosnia and Herzegovina
 Usora Municipality, in modern Bosnia and Herzegovina
 Usora (region), a historic region in ancient Bosnia